Gunnar Jansson (17 July 1907 – 13 May 1998) was a Swedish football forward who played for Sweden in the 1934 FIFA World Cup. He also played for Gefle IF.

References

External links

Swedish footballers
Sweden international footballers
Association football forwards
Gefle IF players
1934 FIFA World Cup players
1907 births
1998 deaths